The Red Smith Award is awarded by the Associated Press Sports Editors (APSE) organization for outstanding contributions to sports journalism. Unlike many journalism awards, it is open to both writers and editors. Winners of the award are traditionally announced in April and it is bestowed in June at the annual APSE convention. It is named in honor of Walter Wellesley "Red" Smith (1905–1982) whose sportswriting career spanned 1927 to 1982, and was the first recipient of the award in 1981.

List of winners

 Awarded posthumously

 Served as president of APSE

References

Awards established in 1981
Associated Press awards
American journalism awards
Sports mass media in the United States
+Red Smith Award